Acyl-coenzyme A thioesterase 12 or StAR-related lipid transfer protein 15 (STARD15) is an enzyme that in humans is encoded by the ACOT12 gene.  The protein contains a StAR-related lipid transfer domain.

References

External links
 
 PDBe-KB provides an overview of all the structure information available in the PDB for Human Acetyl-coenzyme A thioesterase

Further reading

Human proteins